Gymnastics events have been staged at the Olympic Games since 1896. South African female artistic gymnasts have participated in three editions of the Summer Olympics, in 1960, 2004, and 2020. South African women have yet to win a medal at the Olympics.

Gymnasts

References

South Africa
gymnasts
Olympic